Harising Nasaru Rathod (born 4 February 1954) is a member of the 14th Lok Sabha of India. He represents the Yavatmal constituency of Maharashtra and is a member of the Bharatiya Janata Party (BJP) political party. He won office in the 2004 election.

Member, National Commission for Denotified and Nomadic Tribes, 2003-2004; 

Deputy Accountant, 1979-1980; Divisional Accountant, 1980-82; Accounts Officer, 1982-95; 

Founder President, All India Banjara Kranti Dal since 1990

References

External links
 Official biographical sketch in Parliament of India website

Living people
1954 births
Bharatiya Janata Party politicians from Maharashtra
People from Maharashtra
India MPs 2004–2009
Marathi politicians
People from Yavatmal
Lok Sabha members from Maharashtra
People from Yavatmal district